Burkea africana, the wild syringa, is a deciduous, medium-sized, spreading, flat-topped tree belonging to the subfamily Caesalpinioideae of the family Fabaceae. The genus was named in honour of Joseph Burke, the botanist and collector.

Range
Widespread in tropical Africa, it is found in Chad, Sudan, Tanzania, Uganda, Cameroon, the Central African Republic, Zaire, Benin, Burkina Faso, Ivory Coast, Ghana, Guinea, Mali, Niger, Nigeria, Senegal, Togo, Angola, Malawi, Mozambique, Zambia, Zimbabwe, Botswana, Namibia and South Africa in the Transvaal region.

Description
Leaves are bipinnately compound, silvery pubescent or glabrescent. Flowers are creamy white, fragrant and in pendulous racemes of up to 300 mm in length. The bark is toxic, rich in alkaloids and tannins and used for tanning leather. Pulverised bark is thrown into water to paralyse fish.

Uses
If cut from the heartwood, it produces durable, insect-resistant timber with a moderately fine, wavy grain which is dark brown to reddish brown, and is used for parquet flooring and fine cabinet and furniture work.

Food plant
The foliage is browsed by the larvae of two Saturniidae moths, Rohaniella pygmaea and Imbrasia forda.

External links 

Caesalpinioideae
Flora of Africa
Flora of Ivory Coast
Plants described in 1843